is a Japanese professional wrestler better known by the ring name Hub (stylized in all capital letters), currently working as a freelancer and is best known for his tenure with the Japanese promotions Big Japan Pro Wrestling (BJW) and Osaka Pro Wrestling (OPW).

Professional wrestling career

Independent circuit (1999–present)
During his career, Kigawa worked for various promotions for which he made sporadic appearances. On the first night of the Cherry Blossom Tour 2014, an event promoted by Wrestle-1 (W-1), Kigawa teamed up with Tigers Mask and scored a victory over Junior Stars (Koji Kanemoto and Minoru Tanaka). At STRONGHEARTS Action 2 Alpha, an event promoted by Oriental Wrestling Entertainment (OWE) on July 24, 2020, Kigawa teamed up with Dick Togo, Eisa8 and Gaina in a losing effort to StrongHearts (El Lindaman, Issei Onitsuka, Shigehiro Irie and T-Hawk) as a result of an eight-man tag team match. On May 23, 2021, Hub participated at the Hana Kimura Memorial Show, an event produced by Kyoko Kimura to commemorate one year since the passing of her daughter Hana Kimura. He teamed up with Shisaou and Eisa8 to defeat Shota, Fuma, and Mil Mongoose in a six-man tag team match.

DDT Pro–Wrestling/Pro–Wrestling Basara (2011–present)
Kigawa is also known for his seldom activities across the years in DDT Pro Wrestling (DDT) especially in tag team matches. At Dramatic Dreams! Vol.5 he teamed up with Masahiro Takanashi to defeat Men's Teioh and Yasu Urano. At Dramatic Dream! Vol. 6 on May 25, 2019, he teamed up with Isami Kodaka and picked up a victory over Disaster-Box (Naomi Yoshimura and Yuki Ueno). At Dramatic Dreams Vol. 7 on October 18, 2020, he teamed up with Yuki Ueno scoring a defeat to Konosuke Takeshita and Billy Ken Kid. At DAMNATION Produce Illegal Assembly Returns Vol. 3 on February 19, 2021, Hub teamed up with Yasutaka Oosera in a losing effort to Damnation's Daisuke Sasaki and Hiroshi Yamato.

Kigawa usually works under the Pro-Wrestling Basara (Basara) branch of the promotion, making appearances at event such as the Osaka Beer Garden Pro-Wrestling on July 22, 2018 where he teamed up with Iron Priest (Fuma and Yusuke Kubo) in a losing effort to Isami Kodaka, Ryota Nakatsu and Ryuichi Sekine. His most notable victory in Basara took place at BJW Osaka Surprise 52 ~ Proud RulerJuly , an event produce in partnership with Big Japan Pro Wrestling on July 4, 2021, where he teamed up with Andy Wu and Ultimate Spider Jr. to defeat Viva México Cabrones (Billy Ken Kid, Masamune, and Tsubasa) for the UWA World Trios Championship.

Dragon Gate (2012–2013)
Kigawa had a brief tenure with the Dragon Gate (DG) promotion. He is known for participating in the Gate of Destiny series of events, marking his most important victory at the 2012 edition on October 21, where he teamed up with Magnitude Kishiwada and Gamma as part of the "Team Veteran Returns" stable to defeat Mad Blankey's Akira Tozawa, BxB Hulk and Naoki Tanisaki for the Open the Triangle Gate Championship.

New Japan Pro Wrestling (2008–2012)
Kigawa made several appearances at shows hosted by New Japan Pro Wrestling (NJPW). At NJPW Exciting Battle In Okinawa on January 22, 2010, he teamed up with Golden Pine, Jushin Thunder Liger and Super Delfin, scoring a victory over Menso-re Oyaji, Mil Mongoose, Ryusuke Taguchi and Super Shisa in an eight-man tag team match. Hub continued to work in these kinds of matches following his appearance at NJPW Exciting Battle In Okinawa on March 25, 2011, where he teamed up with Kijimuna, Ryusuke Taguchi and Super Shisa to successfully challenge Gurukun Diver, Jushin Thunder Liger, Menso-re Oyaji and Mil Mongoose. His las match for NJPW took place at the 40th Anniversary Tour of the company from March 25, 2012, where he teamed up with Gurukun Diver and Ryusuke Taguchi to defeat Eisa8, Kushida and Menso-re Oyaji.

Osaka Pro–Wrestling (1999–present)
Kigawa made his professional wrestling debut in Osaka Pro Wrestling (Osaka Pro) at the very first event promoted by the company on April 29, 1999, as Super Demekin where he fell short to Magnitude Kishiwada. He is a former Osaka Tag Team Champion, title which he won for the first time on December 15, 2007 at the Michinoku Pro National Tour alongside his long-time tag partner Gaina after defeating Kagetora and Rasse. He is also a former Osaka Openweight Champion, title which he last won at Osaka Pro in Konohana on July 31, 2016 after defeating Tadasuke.

Kigawa is known for taking part in various of the Osaka Hurricane events. The first match took place at the 2005 edition of the event where he defeated Magnitude Kishiwada to win the Osaka Pro Wrestling Championship. At the 2006 edition, competing under the name of Super Dolphin, he defeated his trainer Super Delfin to win the Osaka Pro Wrestling Championship once again.

Championships and accomplishments
Dove Pro Wrestling
Dove Pro Tag Team Championship (1 time) – with Gaina
Dotonbori Pro Wrestling
WDW Tag Team Championship (1 time) – with Orochi
Dragon Gate
Open the Triangle Gate Championship (1 time) – with Magnitude Kishiwada and Gamma
Kyushu Pro Wrestling
Kyushu Pro Tag Team Championship (1 time) – with Genkai
Pro-Wrestling Basara
UWA World Trios Championship (1 time, current) – with Andy Wu and Ultimate Spider Jr.
Okinawa Pro Wrestling
Okinawa Wrestling Championship (2 times)
MWF World Tag Team Championship (2 times) – with Shisaou (1) and Menso-re Oyaji (1)
Osaka Pro Wrestling
Osaka Openweight Championship (2 times)
Osaka Tag Team Championship (2 times, current) – with Gaina
Tenno-Zan Tournament (2005)
Pro Wrestling Zero1
International Junior Heavyweight Championship (2 times)
World Junior Heavyweight Championship (2 times)
NWA International Lightweight Tag Team Championship (2 times) – with Takuya Sugawara (1) and Billy Ken Kid (1)
Tenkaichi Jr. Tournament (2013)
Tenryu Project
WAR International Junior Heavyweight Championship (1 time, current)
Tokyo Gurentai
Tokyo Intercontinental Tag Team Championship (1 time) – with Mazada
VKF Pro Wrestling
VKF King Of Wrestle Naniwa Championship (1 time)

References 

1978 births
Sportspeople from Shizuoka Prefecture
Living people
Japanese male professional wrestlers
20th-century professional wrestlers
21st-century professional wrestlers
UWA World Trios Champions
UWA World Tag Team Champions
Open the Triangle Gate Champions
Tenryu Project International Junior Heavyweight Champions